Yangxin railway station may refer to:
Yangxin railway station (Hubei)
Yangxin railway station (Shandong)